Gabo Pat is a village to the west of Karachi, Pakistan. It extends along the Arabian Sea coast westwards from the harbour of Karachi until the border with Balochistan province, and forms the westernmost part of Karachi West district. The area is very lightly populated with small rural and fishing villages. Abdul Rehman Village is the largest fishing village of Gabopat, which lacks of basic facilities including health, education, electricity, gas etc.

There are several ethnic groups in Kiamari Town including Muhajirs, Sindhis, Christians, Punjabis, Kashmiris, Seraikis, Pakhtuns, Balochis, Memons, Bohras and Ismailis.

Keamari is represented by PS-89 and PS-90 represents in Sindh Assembly.

Karachi Nuclear Power Plants (KANUPP)
The Karachi Nuclear Power Plant are located in Gabo Pat. The KANUPP-I was built in 1972. While KANUPP-2 and KANUPP-3 are under construction.

References

External links 
 Karachi Website.
 Kiamari Town.
 Local Fallout From Pakistan's Nuclear Energy Bet

Neighbourhoods of Karachi
Kiamari Town